The Old Jail was a pub in Jail Lane, Biggin Hill, Westerham, Kent, in the London Borough of Bromley. At this time of writing, (February 2023), it is permanently closed. Its future use is unknown.

It is a Grade II listed building, dating back to the 18th century.

Partial History
The Bromley Borough Local History Society and Biggin Hill History Group assert that it was used to hold French prisoners of war, overnight, during Napolionic times, who were being transported to Maidstone.
Also, that it belonged to the 'Fox Brewery', of Green Street Green, which closed, in 1908; and that it was sold by auction on the 15th. June, 1909.
The Biggin Hill History Group further says, (records 33-37), that by 1939, there were three occupants: Leonard A Dupree, (Innkeeper); Nellie Dupere (wife); their son, John, (16); and Gold L. Fitts, (Domestic).

References

External links
 
 

Grade II listed pubs in London
Grade II listed buildings in the London Borough of Bromley
Pubs in the London Borough of Bromley